Fuente de los Cántaros is an outdoor fountain and sculpture of an indigenous woman in Mexico City's Parque México, in Mexico, created by José María Hernández Urbina in 1927, and restored in 2008.

Description and history

The fountain was created by José María Hernández Urbina, with Luz Jiménez, an indigenous Nahua woman, as the model, in 1927. The statue, 3 m in height and constructed from concrete, depicts a naked woman with a water pitcher under each arm, from which the water flowed. Locally she is referred to as La Muñeca or the Mujer de los Cántaros. The fountain faces onto Calle de Michoacán, which divides the park, at the entrance to the Teatro al Aire Libre Lindbergh (Lindbergh Forum, named for Charles Lindbergh). Urbina, together with the architect Roberto Montenegro was one of the creators of the Forum, with its Art Deco features, in the 1920s, at the time that Colonia Condesa was being developed. The statue has come to symbolize the Mexican people (Mexicayotl or Mexicanidad) before The Conquest. The Forum was poorly maintained, and fell into disrepair, but in 2008 a restoration began at a cost of 21 million pesos over 17 months, but was considered controversial by local residents. The fountain is considered an important landmark and attracts many visitors.

In popular culture 

The statue has become symbolised in stencil graffiti on the walls of Mexico City, and has been replicated in fibreglass for a film and is a frequent subject for artists.

See also 

 1927 in art

Notes

References

Bibliography

External links
 

1927 establishments in Mexico
1927 sculptures
Concrete sculptures
Condesa
Fountains in Mexico
Indigenous peoples in Mexico City
Nude sculptures
Outdoor sculptures in Mexico City
Sculptures of women in Mexico
Statues in Mexico City